The Seli Hydroelectric Plant aims to provide  of hydro electric power in Lahaul & Spitidistrict, Himachal Pradesh, India. The project has been awarded to Moser Baer through the international competitive bidding process. The project component comprises a concrete gravity dam of about  height above river bed level with two head race tunnels of approximately 4.2 km and an underground powerhouse complex on the right bank of river Chenab. Power would be generated by harnessing  average gross head between intake and tail race location.

Project objectives
The Project shall provide:
Peaking power
Renewable energy which helps reduce carbon emissions
Development of remote areas in higher reaches
Sustainable business and lowering cost of generation of electricity

CSR and R&R
CSR activities are being taken regularly under the name EECHHO (Education, Environment, Community Development, Health & Hygiene and Other Activities).

In phased manner tree plantation activity taken up in association with Forest Department. Deodar and other broad leaved species have been planted in the first phase of the drive. SHEPCL is promoting & sponsoring local sports & cultural activities, medical camps etc. for the benefit of local population.

Notes

External links
 http://www.hindustanpowerprojects.com/businesses/hydro-power/projects/hydro-electric-project-seli-himachel-pradesh/

Dams on the Chenab River
Proposed hydroelectric power stations
Proposed renewable energy power stations in India